Samrat Bhau Moze  was a member of Nationalist Congress Party (NCP) in Pune, India.

External links
 India Today - Taking obsession with the yellow metal to all new level
 Gulf News - goldman-pushes-for-electoral-debut-in-pune

Nationalist Congress Party politicians from Maharashtra
People from Pune district
Year of birth missing